Ultimate Otaku Teacher is an anime series adapted from the manga of the same title by Takeshi Azuma. Masato Sato directed the series with scripts written by Atsushi Maekawa at A-1 Pictures. Isao Sugimoto designed the characters and Ryuuichi Takada composed the music. The series aired from April 4 to September 26, 2015. From episodes 1 to 12, the first opening theme is "Youthful Dreamer" by TrySail, and the ending theme is "DREAMIN'" by Tokyo Performance Doll. From episodes 13 to 24, the second opening theme is "Vivid Brilliant door" by Sphere, and the ending theme is "MY ONLY ONE" by 9nine. Funimation has licensed the series in North America.

Episode list

Home releases

Japanese
In Japan, Aniplex released the series in 8 volumes starting from August 26, 2015 to March 23, 2016.

English
In North America, Funimation released the series in 2 parts with the first on November 15, 2016 and the second on February 21, 2017. In Australia and New Zealand it was released by Madman Entertainment in DVD in 2 parts with the first on August 2, 2017 and the second on May 24, 2017.

Notes

References

Ultimate Otaku Teacher